Matana is a Burundian town and colline, seat of the Commune of Matana, in Bururi Province.

Geography
It is 15 km north of Songa, 30 km north of Bururi, and the nearest places are the villages of Rubanga and Butwe.

Religion
Matana is the seat of the homonym Anglican diocese, part of the Province of the Anglican Church of Burundi.

References

External links
Satellite map at Maplandia.com
Matana at World Weather Online

Populated places in Bururi Province